England is a country that is part of the United Kingdom.

England may also refer to:

Places
 Kingdom of England, a sovereign state from the 10th century to 1707
 English Empire (1570–1707)
 Angevin Empire (1140–1260)
 England, Arkansas, United States
 England, Nordstrand, Germany

People
 England (surname)
 Mr England, nickname of English rugby fan Peter Cross (rugby union)
 England captain (disambiguation), the captain of an England national team
 List of English monarchs, who may be referred to as "England"

Culture
 England (band), a progressive rock group
 "England", a 2006 song by Justin Hawkins
 "England", a song by Great Big Sea from Fortune's Favour, 2008
 "England", a song by The National from High Violet, 2010
 "England's", a song by Tim Smith from Tim Smith's Extra Special OceanLandWorld, 1995

Other uses
 List of national sports teams of England
 England (British postage stamps)
 England (1813 ship)

See also

 Terminology of the British Isles
 Great Britain, an island
 United Kingdom, a country
 New England, a region of the northeastern United States
 New England (disambiguation)
 Mr England (disambiguation)
 Britain (disambiguation)
 English (disambiguation)